Elizabeth Duncan may refer to:

Elizabeth Duncan Koontz, née Elizabeth Duncan, African-American educator
Elizabeth Ann Duncan, American murderer
Elizabeth Duncan, co-founder of Duncan, Texas
Elizabeth J. Duncan, Canadian mystery writer
Liz Duncan, character in The Smart Woman Survival Guide
 Elizabeth Duncan (dancer) (1871–1948) was an American dancer and dance teacher